Bisma Khan (born 21 April 2002) is a Pakistani swimmer.

She represented Pakistan at the 2018 Asian Games held in Jakarta, Indonesia. She competed in five events and in each event she did not advance to compete in the final. She also finished in 11th place in the heats in the mixed 4 × 100 metre medley relay event.

In 2019, she represented Pakistan at the World Aquatics Championships held in Gwangju, South Korea. She competed in the women's 50 metre freestyle event. She did not advance to compete in the semi-finals. She also competed in the women's 100 metre butterfly event. In the same year, she won the silver medal in the women's 200 metre individual medley event at the 2019 South Asian Games held in Nepal.

In 2021, she competed in the women's 50 metre freestyle event at the 2020 Summer Olympics held in Tokyo, Japan. In 2022, she represented Pakistan at the World Aquatics Championships held in Budapest, Hungary. She competed in the women's 50 metre freestyle and women's 100 metre freestyle events.

She represented Pakistan at the 2022 Commonwealth Games in Birmingham, England.

References 

Living people
2002 births
Pakistani female swimmers
Pakistani female freestyle swimmers
Female butterfly swimmers
South Asian Games silver medalists for Pakistan
South Asian Games bronze medalists for Pakistan
South Asian Games medalists in swimming
Swimmers at the 2018 Asian Games
Asian Games competitors for Pakistan
Olympic swimmers of Pakistan
Swimmers at the 2020 Summer Olympics
Swimmers from Lahore
21st-century Pakistani women
Swimmers at the 2022 Commonwealth Games
Commonwealth Games competitors for Pakistan